Peacock flower can refer to:

Trees in the pea family, Fabaceae
 Albizia gummifera, native to tropical Africa and Madagascar
Caesalpinia pulcherrima, native to the Americas
Delonix regia, native to Madagascar

Lily-like plants in the family Iridaceae
Dietes bicolor, southern Africa
Gladiolus murielae, Gladiolus callianthus, or Acidanthera bicolor, native to eastern Africa
Moraea villosa, native to South Africa
Tigridia pavonia, native to Mexico and central America

See also
Adenanthera pavonina or peacock flower fence, a species of leguminous tree used for its timber and decorative seeds
Peacock flounder